"D.N.A." is a song written and performed by A Flock of Seagulls from their debut effort, A Flock of Seagulls.

The track incorporated the band's trademark heavy synthesizer sounds, while also integrating skilled arpeggios, layered bass lines and multiple effects. The production techniques borrowed some from the Wall of Sound although it is distinctly a stereo effort.

Reception
The band earned a Grammy Award in 1983 for Best Rock Instrumental Performance. As with the entire album, the song has a futuristic feel, and is part of the alien theme of the concept album. The track has been described by lead singer Mike Score as "warning of the dangers of science".

Upon distinguishing the band with the award, at least one official at the National Academy of Recording Arts and Sciences remarked the song was "distinctive among other acts of the time...for its scope and ambition."

Song appearances
 Used in The Ongoing History of New Music'' episode "Alt-Rock's Greatest Instrumentals" from 2003.

References

1982 songs
A Flock of Seagulls songs
Grammy Award for Best Rock Instrumental Performance
Song recordings produced by Mike Howlett